In Greek mythology, Ergiscus is the son of Poseidon and the naiad nymph Aba. The city of Ergisce (Çatalca) was named after him.

Notes

References 

 Suida, Suda Encyclopedia translated by David Whitehead. Online version at the Topos Text Project.

Children of Poseidon